Patni may refer to:

 Patni (surname), a Digambara Jain family name from India
 Patni Computer Systems, an information technology company
 Patni, 1970 Bollywood Hindi Indian Movie Directed by V.R.Naidu